The 2011 Dow Corning Tennis Classic was an ITF tennis tournament held 7–13 February 2011 in Midland, Michigan, United States for women's professional tennis, with US$100,000 in prize money.  It was organized by the International Tennis Federation under the tier of Women's Tennis Association.

WTA entrants

Seeds

 Rankings are as of February 7, 2011.

Other entrants
The following players received wildcards into the singles main draw:
  Brittany Augustine
  Victoria Duval
  Jessica Pegula
  Shelby Rogers

The following players received entry from the qualifying draw:
  Alexa Glatch
  Ahsha Rolle
  Alexandra Stevenson
  Mashona Washington

Champions

Singles

 Lucie Hradecká def.  Irina Falconi, 6–4, 6–4

Doubles

 Jamie Hampton /  Anna Tatishvili def.  Irina Falconi /  Alison Riske, walkover

External links
ITF search

References

Dow Corning Tennis Classic
Dow Corning Tennis Classic
Dow Corning Tennis Classic
Dow